Sylvie Florence Mballa Éloundou (born 21 April 1977) is a French-Cameroonian sprinter who specializes in the 100 metres.

A native of Yaoundé, the capital of Cameroon, Sylvie Mballa Éloundou originally represented the country of her birth, but changed nationality on 10 October 2002 in order to compete as a member of the French team.  Following another change, on 1 April 2005, she once again entered competition under the flag of Cameroon.

Her personal best time for 100 metres is 11.13 seconds, achieved in July 2005 in Angers, however, at the 2006 IAAF World Indoor Championships in Moscow, she finished the 60 metres race in eighth place.

External links

1977 births
Living people
Cameroonian female sprinters
French female sprinters
Olympic athletes of Cameroon
Athletes (track and field) at the 1996 Summer Olympics
Cameroonian emigrants to France
Sportspeople from Yaoundé
Mediterranean Games gold medalists for France
Mediterranean Games medalists in athletics
Athletes (track and field) at the 2001 Mediterranean Games